was a Japanese film actress and singer whose career spanned five decades.

Career
Born in Nagano Prefecture, Hara made her motion picture debut in 1926 at Nikkatsu when she was still in her early teens. She easily made the transition to adult roles and even to sound film with her good voice. In the 1930s she released her own records and starred in musicals like Singing Lovebirds. She also appeared in serious dramas such as Shirō Toyoda's Young People or Arnold Fanck's Die Tochter des Samurai. She moved into by-roles in the postwar, but continued acting until the 1960s, appearing in a total of over 180 films. She died of old age on 18 November 2004 at the age of 91. She was married to the sound recording engineer Ken'ichi Kagara.

Selected filmography
 The Daughter of the Samurai (1937)
 Young People (若い人) (1937)
 Singing Lovebirds (鴛鴦歌合戦 Oshidori utagassen) (1939)
 Hōrō no utahime (放浪の歌姫) (1950)
 The Life of Oharu (西鶴一代女  Saikaku Ichidai Onna) (1952)

References

External links

1913 births
2004 deaths
Japanese film actresses
Japanese silent film actresses
20th-century Japanese actresses
People from Nagano Prefecture
Japanese child actresses
Musicians from Nagano Prefecture
20th-century Japanese women singers
20th-century Japanese singers